The Agaricales are an order of fungi in the class Agaricomycetes (division Basidiomycota). It is the largest group of mushroom-forming fungi, and includes more than 600 genera and over 25,000 species. Molecular phylogenetics analyses of ribosomal DNA sequences have led to advances in our understanding of the Agaricales, and substantially revised earlier assessments of families and genera. The following families are in the Agaricales, according to Kalichman, Kirk & Matheny (2020), with more recent additions and amendments, as noted. The number of genera and species in each family is taken from Catalogue of Life (2023), unless otherwise noted, and is subject to change as new research is published. Many genera are not as yet assigned to a family.

Families

See also
List of Agaricales genera

Notes

References

Literature cited

 
 
 
 
 

Agaricales families
Agaricales